The first generation of the C/K series is a range of trucks that was manufactured by General Motors from the 1960 to 1966 model years.  Marketed by both the Chevrolet and GMC divisions, the C/K trucks replaced the Task Force generation of trucks.  The first General Motors pickup trucks developed on a dedicated truck platform (no longer a derivative of the GM A platform), the C/K series included pickup trucks, chassis-cab trucks, and medium/heavy commercial trucks.

Breaking from GM tradition, the 1960 truck line was not given a generational name by the company.  As part of a new model nomenclature introduced by GMC, C denoted two-wheel drive vehicles and K is used for 4x4 drive layout.  Replacing second-party conversions, 4x4 drive was offered as a factory-supplied option for the first time.  Alongside pickup trucks, the C/K light truck line served as the basis of the fifth generation of the Chevrolet Suburban/GMC Carryall, which was marketed as either a truck-based wagon (SUV) or a panel van.

Produced by multiple sites across the United States and Canada, the model line was also produced in South America. For the 1967 model year, GM introduced a second generation of the C/K, naming it the coral Action-Line series.

Model overview 

The first-generation C/K trucks were produced from the 1960 to 1966 model years.  For 1963, the model line underwent a mechanical revision, with a more substantial update to the body for the 1964 model year.

Chassis 

The first-generation C/K trucks are built using body-on-frame construction.  Diverging from light truck design precedent, the C/K ended its use of straight frame rails, adopting a drop-center design; -ton and -ton trucks used a hybrid of an X-frame and perimeter-frame layout, while 1-ton trucks used a drop-center ladder frame.

While more complex in design, the drop-center frame was stronger (necessitated by the upgraded suspension); the all-new layout also accommodated many upgrades, including mounting the cab seven inches lower; coinciding with easier entry, the redesign allowed for a lower center of gravity and improved stability.

Suspension 
In a major departure of design precedent in light trucks, independent front suspension replaced the traditional beam front axle, supported by control arms and torsion bar springs.  Two rear suspension configurations were offered for the C/K.  A coil-sprung rear axle with rear-trailing control arms was standard; a leaf-sprung axle was standard on 1-ton trucks and above.  As an option, the coil-spring rear axle was offered with optional rear auxiliary leaf springs.

For 1963, the front suspension was redesigned; to save space and improve durability, coil springs replaced the torsion bar springs.

Powertrain 
For 1960, C/K pickup trucks were powered by three different engines.  A 236 cubic-inline 6 (producing 135 hp) was the standard engine for Chevrolet trucks, with a 305 cubic-inch V6 (producing 150 hp) as standard for GMC trucks; a 283 cubic-inch V8 was optional, producing 160 hp.

For 1962, an alternator became an option for the model line.

For 1963, Chevrolet trucks received two new inline-6 engines, replacing the 236 inline-6.  A 230 cubic-inch six became the base engine (producing 140 hp), while a 292 cubic-inch six (producing 165 hp) was introduced as an optional inline six; the 283 V8 was retuned to 175 hp.  Developed primarily for heavier-duty use, the 292 six closely matched the GMC V6 in output, seeing use in the C/K series through the mid-1980s.

For 1965, Chevrolet trucks received an optional 327 cubic-inch V8, producing 220 hp.  Initially offered for -ton and 1-ton trucks, the 327 was offered for all pickups for 1966.  For 1966, the 230 six was replaced by a 250 cubic-inch inline-6 (155 hp); alongside the 292 six, the 250 would serve as the standard C/K engine into the 1980s.

Body design 

In line with the Task Force series and its predecessors, the first-generation C/K was offered solely with a two-door cab configuration.   The straight-sided Fleetside bed made its return alongside the traditional fendered Stepside bed (GMC Wideside and Fenderside, respectively).

Both the Fleetside and Stepside were offered 6-foot and 8-foot bed lengths; a 9-foot bed length was exclusive to Stepside pickups.

For 1962, the hood was restyled, eliminating the large oval air intakes above a revised grille; two small intake slots were added along with front turn signals above the grille; for 1963, the grille underwent an additional revision.

For 1964, the cab underwent a major update. While sharing the roof and floor structure, the windshield and A-pillar were redesigned, eliminating the intrusive "dogleg" (requiring new set of door stampings); the redesign also brought a redesign of the dashboard and door panels.

From 1965 to 1966, the model line saw few fundamental changes to the body, with air conditioning became an option for the first time.

Trim 

A nomenclature introduced by GMC, the C/K trucks were part of a wider naming system used by General Motors, as P denoted a forward-control chassis (used for delivery trucks), L was for low-cab COE, M was for tandem-axle conventional, and S denoted a cowled (school bus) chassis.

-ton models were the C10 and K10 long-bed and short-bed trucks, and the -ton C20 and K20, as well as the one-ton C30, were also available.

Chevrolet 
Introduced for 1960, GM reorganized its model designation system for Chevrolet trucks.

For 1960 and 1961, Chevrolet adopted the series names from the Task Force trucks onto the C/K, with the lighter-duty 10-40 series trucks badged as "Apache", 50-60 series trucks, "Viking", and the largest 70-80 series as "Spartan".

The Chevrolet model line offered under a single trim level, offering optional "Custom" trim upgrades.

GMC 

For 1960, GMC also reorganized its own divisional model designation system. The  Chevrolet C40 and GMC 3000 (offered only as chassis-cab and stake truck) used the light-duty cab, lasting only through the 1963 model year. While GMC did not use the C designation, it used the K designation on 4x4 trucks.

In contrast to Chevrolet, GMC offered two trim levels, a standard "Deluxe" trim and an upgrade "Custom Cab" trim.

Variants

Utility vehicles 

The first-generation C/K formed the basis of the fifth-generation Chevrolet Suburban/GMC Carryall.  Competing against the International Travelall and the Jeep Wagoneer, the Suburban became a Chevrolet nameplate (as GMC adopted the Carryall nameplate).  Sharing the mechanical upgrades of the C/K truck chassis, the Suburban received factory fitment of four-wheel drive, independent front suspension on rear-wheel drive "C" models, and continued to share body and mechanical commonality with its pickup counterpart.

While marketed solely as a two-door utility wagon, the Suburban was offered in -ton 10-series and -ton 20-series; a 1-ton C30 Suburban panel van was offered as an option (alongside the Chevrolet Van).

From 1964 to 1988, the Chevrolet Veraneio was produced by GM Brazil as a five-door truck-based wagon.  Derived from the C-14 pickup (itself, loosely based on the first-generation C/K, sharing an instrument panel and other components), the Veraneio received a full set of doors two generations before its American Suburban counterpart (the latter, in 1973).

Medium- & heavy-duty models

Above the C/K pickup truck range and the -ton Chevrolet C40/GMC 3000, General Motors marketed its medium-duty and heavy-duty truck ranges.  While designed with straight frame rails and heavier-duty chassis components (though retaining its independent front suspension), the medium-duty C50 and C60 (GMC 3500, 4000, 5000) shared a common cab design with the C/K pickup trucks.  Several variants of the medium-duty range were produced, including the L-series short-hood conventional and S-series cowled bus chassis.  A heavier-duty version of the C60 (the C60-H) expanded its GVWR from 19,500 lbs to 22,000 lbs.

The heavy duty C-series range expanded from chassis-cab trucks to include conventional semitractors of multiple configurations, with Chevrolet offering the C60-H, C70, and C80 (GMC 5500/6000/6500).  The short-hood L-series was also offered in the same size ranges, with the tandem rear-axle M-series (GMC W-series).

Medium-duty trucks were:
 -ton Chevrolet C40 / GMC 3000 (1960–62), with the light-duty cab;
 Chevrolet C50 and C60;
 GMC 3500, 4000 and 5000.

Heavy-duty trucks were:
 Chevrolet C60-H (a C60 with a heavier GVWR: 22,000 lbs instead of 19,500 lbs), C70 (1960–61) and C80;
 Chevrolet tandem rear axle models M60 (1963–66), M70 (1960–61) and M80 (1962–66);
 GMC 5500, 6000 and 6500;
 GMC tandem rear axle models W5000, W5500 and W6500.

References 

Chevrolet trucks
Pickup trucks
Motor vehicles manufactured in the United States
1960s cars